Isaac Kiese Thelin (born 24 June 1992) is a Swedish professional footballer who plays as a forward for Malmö FF and the Sweden national team. A full international since 2014, he has won more than 30 caps for Sweden and represented his country at the 2018 FIFA World Cup.

Club career

Early career

Kiese Thelin began his career at Karlslunds IF from Örebro, a club he had been playing football for since the age of five. He played from the club as they played in Sweden's Division 1, Division 2 and Division 3. In 2011, he transferred to newly promoted Allsvenskan side IFK Norrköping. Kiese Thelin made his breakthrough in the 2012 season when he appeared in eleven matches for the club and scored twice. For the 2013 season he increased his appearances to 25 and scored another four goals. After having appeared regularly during the beginning of the 2014 season, it was announced on 4 June 2014 that Kiese Thelin had signed a four-year contract with fellow Allsvenskan club and reigning champions Malmö FF.

Malmö FF
On 4 June 2014, it was announced that Kiese Thelin would transfer to Malmö FF. It was announced that Malmö FF were in negotiations with IFK Norrköping to complete the transfer in summer of 2014 instead of completing the transfer after the season when Kiese Thelin's contract ended. On 5 July 2014 it was confirmed by Malmö FF that Kiese Thelin would join the club on 15 July 2014. He made his debut for the club in the first leg of the second qualifying round to the 2014–15 UEFA Champions League against FK Ventspils on 16 July 2014. Kiese Thelin would prove to play a crucial part of the team that defended the Allsvenskan league title and qualified for the group stage of the 2014–15 UEFA Champions League. In his 14 league appearances for the club he scored five goals, the first against Kalmar FF in the away fixture on 19 July 2014. He also scored two important goals for the club in the UEFA Champions League qualifying campaign, the first in the away game against FK Ventspils on 23 July 2014 and the second in the away game against Sparta Prague on 29 July 2014. Overall Kiese Thelin participated in all of the club's 12 matches in the 2014–15 UEFA Champions League. After the season, he was nominated for newcomer of the year at Svenska idrottsgalan. On 20 January 2015 Malmö FF announced that they had reached a verbal agreement with Ligue 1 side Bordeaux for the transfer of Kiese Thelin.

Bordeaux
On 22 January 2015, Ligue 1 club Bordeaux confirmed the transfer of Kiese Thelin. He signed a contract lasting until 2019. He made his debut two days later in a goalless draw against SC Bastia, appearing in the whole match.

Loan to RSC Anderlecht
On 5 January 2017, the Swedish striker joined Belgian Jupiler Pro League giant Anderlecht on loan. He was resent to Anderlecht on 24 May for the following season.

Anderlecht 
On 31 August 2017, RSC Anderlecht bought his rights from Bordeaux and loaned him to Waasland-Beveren.

Loan to Bayer Leverkusen
On 7 August 2018, Bayer 04 Leverkusen announced the signing on Kiese Thelin on a season-long loan, until 30 June 2019.

Loan to Malmö FF
On 9 January 2020, Kiese Thelin returned to former club Malmö FF on a season-long loan. On 8 November 2020 he scored his 13th Allsvenskan goal of the season in a 4–0 win against IK Sirius to help Malmö FF become Swedish Champions for the 21st time.

Loan to Kasımpaşa 
Kiese Thelin signed for Turkish Süper Lig side Kasımpaşa on loan in January 2021.

Baniyas 
In September 2021, Kiese Thelin signed with Baniyas.

Return to Malmö FF 
Kiese Thelin spent 2021 in Turkey and the United Arab Emirates at Kasımpaşa and Baniyas respectively. Ahead of the 2022 Allsvenskan season, he then returned to Malmö FF on a free transfer, signing a four-year contract with the club.

International career
Kiese Thelin was selected for Sweden U17 in 2009, he made three caps and scored once.
Thelin was selected for Sweden U21 in 2014 and scored two goals in his first two appearances. He made his international debut on 15 November 2014 against Montenegro.

In May 2018 he was named in the Sweden national team's 23-man squad for the 2018 FIFA World Cup in Russia.

Personal life 
He was born to a Swedish mother and a Congolese father.

Career statistics

Club

International

Scores and results list Sweden's goal tally first, score column indicates score after each Kiese Thelin goal.

Honours
Karlslunds IF

 Division 3 Västra Svealand: 2011

Malmö FF
Allsvenskan: 2014, 2020
Svenska Cupen: 2021–22
Svenska Supercupen: 2014

Anderlecht
Belgian First Division: 2016–17
Belgian Super Cup: 2017
Sweden U21
UEFA European Under-21 Championship: 2015

References

External links
Bordeaux profile

1992 births
Living people
Swedish footballers
Association football forwards
IFK Norrköping players
Malmö FF players
FC Girondins de Bordeaux players
R.S.C. Anderlecht players
Bayer 04 Leverkusen players
S.K. Beveren players
Kasımpaşa S.K. footballers
Baniyas Club players
Allsvenskan players
Ligue 1 players
Belgian Pro League players
Bundesliga players
Süper Lig players
UAE Pro League players
Swedish expatriate footballers
Expatriate footballers in France
Expatriate footballers in Belgium
Expatriate footballers in Germany
Expatriate footballers in Turkey
Expatriate footballers in the United Arab Emirates
Swedish expatriate sportspeople in France
Swedish expatriate sportspeople in Belgium
Swedish expatriate sportspeople in the United Arab Emirates
Sportspeople from Örebro
Sweden international footballers
Sweden youth international footballers
Sweden under-21 international footballers
Swedish people of Democratic Republic of the Congo descent
Swedish sportspeople of African descent
2018 FIFA World Cup players